IACA may refer to:

 Indian Arts and Crafts Act of 1990
 International Anti-Corruption Academy
 International Association of Consulting Actuaries
 International Association of Crime Analysts